Robert Konrad (born November 12, 1976) is an American financial advisor and former American football fullback who played in the National Football League (NFL). He was drafted by the Miami Dolphins in the second round of the 1999 NFL Draft. He attended Syracuse University, where he played college football for the Syracuse Orange.

Early years
Konrad attended St. John's Preparatory School in Danvers, Massachusetts, where he played for their high school football team.

College career
Konrad enrolled at Syracuse University, where he played college football for the Syracuse Orange football team. He is the last Orange football player to wear the uniform number 44, as his number was retired during the 2005 season.

Professional career
The Miami Dolphins selected Konrad in the second round, with the 43rd overall selection, of the 1999 NFL Draft. He played for the Dolphins from 1999 through 2004. He played for the Oakland Raiders during the 2005 preseason, and was released before the start of the regular season.

Post-football career
Konrad is currently the CEO of Alterna Financial and also one of the managing directors of Alterna Equity Partners. He became a member of the Florida State Board of Administration's Investment Advisory Council in 2007.

Konrad is also founder, and non-executive chairman of Socius Family Office. 

Konrad fell off of his boat while fishing alone in the Atlantic Ocean on January 7, 2015, and swam  to safety. It took him 12 hours to swim to shore.

References

1976 births
Living people
American football fullbacks
Miami Dolphins players
People from Danvers, Massachusetts
Players of American football from New York (state)
Sportspeople from Rochester, New York
Syracuse Orange football players
Sportspeople from Essex County, Massachusetts
Survivors of seafaring accidents or incidents